As of , over eighty countries have operated artificial satellites.

Suborbital only 
In addition, some countries have only attained a suborbital spaceflight, and have yet to launch a satellite into orbit.

See also
 Timeline of first orbital launches by country
 Timeline of spaceflight

References

satellite